A mid-range speaker is a loudspeaker driver that reproduces sound in the frequency range from 250 to 2000 Hz.

Mid-range drivers are usually cone types or, less commonly, dome types, or  compression horn drivers. The radiating diaphragm of a cone mid-range unit is a truncated cone, with a voice coil attached at the neck, along with the spider portion of the suspension, and with the cone surround at the wide end. Cone mid-range drivers typically resemble small woofers. The most common material used for mid-range cones is paper, occasionally impregnated and/or surface-treated with polymers or resins in order to improve vibrational damping. Other mid-range cone materials include plastics such as polypropylene, Cobex, Bextrene, woven Kevlar, fiberglass, carbon fiber, or light metal alloys based on aluminium, magnesium, titanium, or other alloys. The radiating surface of a dome mid-range is typically a 90-degree section of a sphere, made from cloth, metal, or plastic film, with its suspension and voice coil co-located at the outer edge of the dome. Most professional concert mid-range drivers are compression drivers coupled to horns. A very few mid-ranges are electrostatic drivers, planar magnetic drivers, or ribbon drivers.

A mid-range driver is called upon to handle the most significant part of the audible sound spectrum, the region where the most fundamental frequencies are emitted by musical instruments, and, most importantly, the human voice, lie. This region contains most sounds which are the most familiar to the human ear, and where discrepancies from faithful reproduction are most easily observed. It is therefore paramount that a mid-range driver of good quality be capable of low-distortion reproduction.

Most television sets and small radios have only a single mid-range driver, or two for stereo sound. With human speech being the most important aspect of television audio, it works out well. Since the ear is most sensitive to the middle frequencies produced by a mid-range the driver and amplifier can both be low power, while still delivering what is perceived to be good sound both in terms of volume and quality.

Installation issues
Mid-range drivers are usually used in three way multi driver speaker systems. There are therefore special considerations involved in the acoustic join between the mid-range and both the low frequency (woofers) and the high frequency drivers (tweeters). The nature of the drivers on both sides of the mid-range, and the mid-range itself affect the selection of crossover frequency and slope. Nearly all crossovers are passive circuits, designed to match the characteristics of the drivers and their mounting, and are built of capacitors, inductors, and resistors. Active or 'electronic' crossovers are used in some high performance hi-fi speakers, and in professional sound reinforcement systems. 

Placement of the mid-range (and tweeter) drivers on the enclosure baffle significantly affects the output of the driver, and the material surrounding the mid-range and tweeter drivers on the baffle can produce (or inhibit) reflections of energy from the baffle face, or other items, further influencing the output. Grilles, especially those with structural frames, can further modify the output of the entire speaker system. One of the terms used in design circles to describe some of these diffraction and reflection artifacts is the baffle step effect.

When a mid-range speaker is mounted in the same box as a woofer, it will have its own small sub-enclosure, or a sealed back, to prevent the woofer's backwave radiation into the box from affecting the mid-range's cone or dome motion.

See also
 Loudspeaker
 Loudspeaker enclosure
 Audio crossover
 Full-range speaker
 Tweeter
 Super tweeter
 Woofer
 Subwoofer

References

Loudspeakers